General Francisco R. Murguía is a municipality in the Mexican state of Zacatecas, located approximately  north of the state capital of Zacatecas City.

Geography
It borders the Zacatecan municipalities of Mazapil to the northeast, Villa de Cos to the southeast, Río Grande to the southwest, and Juan Aldama to the west. It also borders three municipalities of Durango to the north and northwest: Santa Clara, General Simón Bolívar, and San Juan de Guadalupe.

As of 2009, the land cover in Francisco R. Murguía comprises matorral (53%), grassland (24%), and mezquital (2%). Another 21% of the land is used for agriculture. The municipality lies in the endorheic basin of the Aguanaval River, which flows south to north through the municipality. The small mountain range called the Sierra de Guadalupe rises in the south-central part of the municipality, and was formerly exploited for its deposits of copper, antimony and mercury.

Francisco R. Murguía has a semi-arid climate with dry winters.

History
Prior to the arrival of the Spanish, the area in what is now the municipality of General Francisco R. Murguía was inhabited by Chichimeca peoples. The expedition of Francisco de Ibarra arrived in the area on 5 August 1558, naming it Santa Maria de las Nieves after the feast on that day. In the 18th century it took the name of Real de Minas in reference to the local mining activities, but was renamed Nieves later in the same century.

After the independence of Mexico, Nieves was one of the original partidos named in Zacatecas's state constitution first enacted on 17 January 1825. It became a free municipality on 19 August 1916. In 1964, the municipality was renamed in honour of General , who was born in Mazapil and fought in the Mexican Revolution.

Administration
The municipal government of Francisco R. Murguía comprises a president, a councillor (Spanish: síndico), and thirteen trustees (regidores), eight elected by relative majority and five by proportional representation. The current president of the municipality is Javier Garcia (2021).

Demographics
In the 2010 Mexican Census, the municipality of Francisco R. Murguía recorded a population of 21,974 inhabitants living in 5427 households. The 2015 Intercensal Survey estimated a population of 21,809 inhabitants in Francisco R. Murguía.

INEGI lists 76 localities in the municipality, of which only the municipal seat Nieves is classified as urban. It recorded a population of 5653 inhabitants in the 2010 Census.

Economy
The main economic activity in Francisco R. Murguía is agriculture. The main crops grown are forage oats, beans, and corn. Cattle, sheep and goats are also raised.

References

Municipalities of Zacatecas
1825 establishments in Mexico
States and territories established in 1825